The vice president of the Russian Federation (before 25 December 1991 – vice president of the Russian Soviet Federative Socialist Republic) was the first in the presidential line of succession, becoming the new president of Russia upon the death, resignation, or removal of the president. Additionally, the vice president would assume the presidential duties in case the president becomes incapable of carrying out the presidential duties.

Eligibility
According to the article 121-2 of the Russian Constitution of 1978, a citizen of Russia, no younger than 35 years old and no older than 65 years old, who is in possession of suffrage, may be elected vice president. The vice president shall not be people's deputy, or hold any other offices in state or public bodies as well as in businesses.

Election
The vice president was elected simultaneously with the president. A candidate for vice president was nominated by a candidate for president.

Duties
The vice president executed individual assignments on a commission of the president and acted for the president in his absence or in case when it would be impossible for the president to attend to his duties.

Abolition
Following the 1993 Russian constitutional crisis the office was abolished. The position of the Prime Minister of Russia became the second-highest ranking public office, and in the event of the president's incapacitation, death or resignation, the prime minister would assume the presidential powers and duties as acting president. This was evinced in the succession of then-prime minister Vladimir Putin to the presidential powers and duties after the resignation of Boris Yeltsin, due to illness, on December 31, 1999.

List of people to hold the office

See also
President of Russia 
1993 Russian constitutional crisis
Acting President of the Russian Federation

External links
Russian Constitution of 1978. Chapter 13-1: President of the Russian Federation

Government of Russia
Russia
 
Titles held only by one person